The 1978 Wisconsin gubernatorial election was held on November 7, 1978.  Republican Lee S. Dreyfus won the election with 54% of the vote, winning his first term as Governor of Wisconsin and defeating incumbent Democrat Martin J. Schreiber. Bob Kasten unsuccessfully sought the Republican nomination.

As of 2018, this marks the last occasion that Florence County has voted Democratic in a gubernatorial election.

Results

References

1978 Wisconsin elections
1978
Wisconsin